Phyllichthys is a genus of soles native to the Western Pacific and Eastern Indian oceans.

Species
There are currently three recognized species in this genus:
 Phyllichthys punctatus McCulloch, 1916 (Spotted sole)
 Phyllichthys sclerolepis (W. J. Macleay, 1878)
 Phyllichthys sejunctus Whitley, 1935

References

Soleidae
Taxa named by Allan Riverstone McCulloch
Marine fish genera